Lockport is a city in Will County, Illinois, United States, located 30 miles southwest of Chicago. Per the 2020 census, the population was 26,094. The city was incorporated in 1853.  It is situated along the Illinois and Michigan (I&M) Canal, and was the headquarters of the canal when the canal was operating.  A section of the canal runs through Lockport, including the remains of the canal's Lock No. 1 from which the town received its name. The canal right-of-way is now the Illinois and Michigan National Heritage Corridor.

Geography
Lockport is located on the east bank of the Des Plaines River just north of Joliet. The village of Lemont is about two miles to the north along the river.

Demographics

2020 census

Note: the US Census treats Hispanic/Latino as an ethnic category. This table excludes Latinos from the racial categories and assigns them to a separate category. Hispanics/Latinos can be of any race.

2000 Census
Although the population was 15,191 at the 2000 census (and then estimated it would be 22,161 in 2005), a special census of 2003 counted 25,191 people, 13,599 households, and 12,137 families residing in the city. The racial makeup of the city was 95.82% White, 1.11% African American, 0.22% Native American, 0.75% Asian, 0.01% Pacific Islander, 0.94% from other races, and 1.15% from two or more races. Hispanic or Latino people of any race were 4.34% of the population.

There were 8,599 households, out of which 38.5% had children under the age of 18 living with them, 60.9% were married couples living together, 9.7% had a female householder with no husband present, and 26.1% were non-families. 20.8% of all households were made up of individuals, and 6.9% had someone living alone who was 65 years of age or older. The average household size was 2.71 and the average family size was 3.17.

In the city, the population was spread out, with 28.2% under the age of 18, 7.7% from 18 to 24, 36.1% from 25 to 44, 18.0% from 45 to 64, and 10.1% who were 65 years of age or older. The median age was 33 years. For every 100 females, there were 96.8 males. For every 100 females age 18 and over, there were 94.1 males.
The median income for a household in the city was $72,231, and the median income for a family was $81,717. Males had a median income of $65,759 versus $42,551 for females. The per capita income for the city was $32,939. About 3.2% of families and 3.5% of the population were below the poverty line, including 4.3% of those under age 18 and 1.2% of those age 65 or over.

Parks and recreation

The City of Lockport, Illinois has a park district titled the Lockport Township Park District that was created in 1945. It manages and maintains 38 parks and several recreational programs with the goal to "enrich the quality of life of the community". According to the city's website, each park should provide at least one of the following recreational activities: A place to engage in sports, open spaces in which children may play in, pavilions for picnics or gatherings, playgrounds, and other facilities.

Museums and historic sites
Downtown Lockport contains four museums, all within walking distance of one another, as well as other historic places.

Gaylord Building. 
The Gaylord Building is a historic site of the National Trust for Historic Preservation. It was constructed in 1838 of local limestone for use as a warehouse and is situated on the east side of the Illinois & Michigan Canal, just north of downtown Lockport. Renovated in the 1980s, the building now houses a restaurant and has historical galleries.

Illinois and Michigan Canal Museum
Located in the original 1837 Canal headquarters building, the Illinois and Michigan Canal Museum offers 10 rooms filled with artifacts, pictures and documents relating to the construction and operation of the Canal, as well as period items specific to the region during the height of the Canal's operation.

The Lockport Gallery
The Lockport Gallery celebrates Illinois through changing exhibits featuring paintings, drawings, sculptures, quilts and other media created by the state's artists and artisans. These rotating, theme-based exhibits are supplemented and showcased through educational events, group tours and outreach programs for all ages. An Illinois State Museum (ISM) facility, the Lockport Gallery is located in a structure that is itself a work of art and history. The historic Norton Building was constructed on the banks of the Illinois and Michigan Canal in 1850 to serve as a grain-processing facility. Today the building is a multi-use facility housing residential lofts, offices, commercial space and the Lockport Gallery. The Gallery's space gracefully incorporates the building's original features, including large windows (once arched portals used for loading and unloading), high ceilings, and hardwood floors.

The Gladys Fox Museum
Maintained by the Lockport Township Park District, the Gladys Fox Museum is located in the 1839 Old Congregational Church. Beautifully restored, this historic building is now home to the museum's collection of historical photographs and memorabilia celebrating Dellwood Park and the Illinois and Michigan Canal.

Lincoln Landing
Newly constructed just south of the Gaylord building and directly adjacent to the I&M Canal by the Give Something Back Foundation, the Lincoln Landing is a unique open air park and museum. The park shows the original I & M Canal lines with a statue of Lincoln contemplating the canal. Bronze medallions are placed all about the park with historical information. Each medallion then leads you to another with connected information.

Schools

Taft School District 90
  In the 19th century it was called school district #9 of Lockport Township, and its school was called the South Lockport School.  The district now has one school, called Taft School.

Milne-Kelvin Grove School District 91
  It has two grade schools.

Milne Grove Elementary School
Milne Grove has kindergarten through grade three.

Kelvin Grove Middle School
Kelvin Grove has grades four through eight; sixth through eighth grade operate as a middle school.

Will County School District 92
Will County School District 92 is a public grade school district which serves grades K-8. It mainly serves the communities of Lockport and Homer Glen. It contains four buildings: Walsh, Reed, Ludwig, and Oak Prairie with the administration building adjacent to Ludwig.

Walsh School
Walsh School is an elementary school educating students from PreK through grade one.

Reed School
Reed School is an elementary school educating students grades two and three.

Ludwig School
Ludwig School is an elementary school educating students grades four and five.

Oak Prairie Junior High School 
Oak Prairie Junior High School is a middle school educating students in grades six through eight.

High schools

Three other grade school districts cover parts of Lockport.  The eastern part of Lockport is in Homer Community Consolidated School District 33C.  The northern part of Lockport is in Will County School District 92.  The southern part of Lockport is served by the Fairmont School District 89.

All of the city is in Lockport Township High School District 205, which operates Lockport Township High School at a Central and East campus, both in the city. The district serves about 3,700 students from the communities of Crest Hill, Fairmont, Homer Glen, Lockport, Homer Township and Lockport Township. The Central Campus opened in 1910 and serves freshman students while the East Campus opened in 1964 and serves sophomores, juniors and seniors.

Private schools
Lockport has two private grade schools: Saint Dennis (Catholic) School at 1201 S. Washington St. and St. Joseph (Catholic) School at 529 S. Madison St.

There are also two private high schools in the area: Providence Catholic High School in New Lenox and Joliet Catholic Academy in Joliet.

Transportation
Lockport has a station on Metra's Heritage Corridor, which provides weekday rush hour rail service between Joliet, and Chicago, Illinois (at Union Station). Lockport is very close to Metra's Rock Island District.

Major highways
Major highways in Lockport include:

Interstate Highways
 Interstate 355

US Highways
 Historic US 66

Illinois Highways
 Route 7 (159th Street)
 Route 53
 Route 171 (State Street)

In popular culture
Some scenes in the 2009 film Public Enemies were shot in Lockport.

The Image Comics series Radiant Black in the Massive Verse is primarily set in Lockport, being the hometown of main characters Nathan Burnett and Marshall.

Notable people

 Louis Bottino, Illinois state representative and educator, lived in Lockport.
 Harry Decker, MLB all-positions player for several teams
 Jim Donahue, catcher for the New York Metropolitans, Kansas City Cowboys, and Columbus Solons
 Tom Haller, catcher for the San Francisco Giants, Los Angeles Dodgers, and Detroit Tigers
 Richaun Holmes, basketball player for the Sacramento Kings
 Daniel H. Paddock, Illinois state representative and lawyer, born in Lockport.
 CM Punk, professional wrestler now signed into AEW and retired mixed martial artist. 
 Luke Scanlan, Wisconsin State Assemblyman and farmer, was born near Lockport
 Alando Tucker, basketball player for the Phoenix Suns and Minnesota Timberwolves
 Mike Zimmer, NFL coach, former head coach for the Minnesota Vikings

Sister city
  - Asiago, Vicenza, Veneto, Italy

References

External links

 

 
Cities in Will County, Illinois
Chicago metropolitan area
Populated places established in 1853
1853 establishments in Illinois
Cities in Illinois